Chic (foaled February 27, 2000) is a chestnut Thoroughbred racehorse. A filly, she is owned and bred by Cheveley Park Stud and was trained by Sir Michael Stoute. Out of the mare Exclusive, winner of the 1998 Group One Coronation Stakes, Chic was sired by Machiavellian, a French champion at age two who was a son of the very influential American sire Mr. Prospector. She is a half-sister to Echelon, the 2007 Matron Stakes winner, and is closely related to Entrepreneur, the 1997 2,000 Guineas winner.

Career Highs 
Chic won the 2004 Hungerford Stakes and the Celebration Mile, taking the latter again in 2005. She remains the only horse to have back-to-back wins in this race. In 2007 Chic's half sister Echelon  also went on to win this race. In Chic's short career she earned £281,600 in prize money, and won 6 times from 20 starts.

Race performances

Notes

References 
 Chic's pedigree and partial racing stats

2000 racehorse births
Thoroughbred family 6-e
Racehorses bred in the United Kingdom
Racehorses trained in the United Kingdom